The 1944 Nevada Wolf Pack football team was an American football team that represented the University of Nevada as an independent during the 1944 college football season. In their sixth under head coach Jim Aiken, the Wolf Pack compiled a 4–4 record.

Bill Mackrides starred for the 1944 Wolf Pack. He later played seven years of professional football in the National Football League (NFL) and Canadian Football League (CFL).

Schedule

References

Nevada
Nevada Wolf Pack football seasons
Nevada Wolf Pack football